Probability in the Engineering and Informational Sciences is an international journal published by  Cambridge University Press. The founding Editor-in-chief is  Sheldon M. Ross.

Editors
1987– Sheldon M. Ross.

References

Cambridge University Press academic journals
Computer science education in the United Kingdom
Computer science in the United Kingdom
Computer science journals
Publications established in 1987